An election to Durham County Council took place on 2 May 2013 as part of the 2013 United Kingdom local elections. Following a boundary review, 126 councillors were elected from 63 electoral divisions which returned either one, two or three councillors each by first-past-the-post voting for a four-year term of office. The previous election took place in 2008 in advance of the council becoming a unitary authority after the 2009 changes to local government. The election saw the Labour Party increase their majority on the council.

All locally registered electors (British, Commonwealth and European Union citizens) who were aged 18 or over on Thursday 2 May 2013 were entitled to vote in the local elections. Those who were temporarily away from their ordinary address (for example, away working, on holiday, in student accommodation or in hospital) were also entitled to vote in the local elections, although those who had moved abroad and registered as overseas electors cannot vote in the local elections. It is possible to register to vote at more than one address (such as a university student who had a term-time address and lives at home during holidays) at the discretion of the local Electoral Register Office, but it remains an offence to vote more than once in the same local government election.

Summary
The Statement of Persons Nominated was published on 8 April 2013. In total 362 candidates stood in the election. The Labour Party had the most candidates, with 125 standing out of a possible 126 and only one candidate standing in the two member Weardale electoral division. The Conservative Party stood 59 candidates, the Liberal Democrats 40, the United Kingdom Independence Party 31 and the Green Party 15 candidates. A number of local independent groups stood, including 16 Derwentside Independents and 11 Wear Valley Independents. Nine candidates stood for the Free Association for Independent Representation (FAIR) around Peterlee and Ferryhill, and four for the Spennymoor Independents in Spennymoor and Tudhoe. There were 50 other independent candidates, including two candidates with no description. The British National Party stood two candidates, having fielded 30 in the previous election.

The Labour Party gained 27 seats, increasing their majority on the council to 62. The Liberal Democrats lost 18 seats compared to the 2008 results, with their representation on the new council limited to the city of Durham and the division of Consett North. The Conservative Party lost six seats, winning only in the two Barnard Castle divisions.

Turnout across the county was 27.8%, having fallen from 36.4% in the 2008 elections.

Results summary

|-
! style="background-color:#ffffff; width: 3px;" |  
| style="width: 130px" |Derwentside Independents
| align="right" | 8
| align="right" | N/A
| align="right" | N/A
| align="right" | −2
| align="right" | 6.3
| align="right" | 6.2
| align="right" | 11,482
| align="right" | −1.0%
|-

|-
! style="background-color:#ffffff; width: 3px;" |  
| style="width: 130px" |Wear Valley Independent Group
| align="right" | 1
| align="right" | N/A
| align="right" | N/A
| align="right" | +1
| align="right" | 0.8
| align="right" | 2.2
| align="right" | 4,954
| align="right" | New
|-
! style="background-color:#ffffff; width: 3px;" |  
| style="width: 130px" |Spennymoor Independents People Before Politics
| align="right" | 1
| align="right" | N/A
| align="right" | N/A
| align="right" | +1
| align="right" | 0.8
| align="right" | 1.2
| align="right" | 2,621
| align="right" | New
|-

|-
! style="background-color:#ffffff; width: 3px;" |  
| style="width: 130px" |Free Association for Independent Representation (FAIR)
| align="right" | 0
| align="right" | N/A
| align="right" | N/A
| align="right" | 0
| align="right" | 0.0
| align="right" | 2.4
| align="right" | 5,389
| align="right" | New
|-

|}

Results by electoral division

A − B

|- style="background-color:#F6F6F6" 
! style="background-color:#ffffff" | 
| colspan="5" | Derwentside Independents win
|-
|- style="background-color:#F6F6F6" 
! style="background-color:#ffffff" | 
| colspan="5" | Derwentside Independents win
|-

|- style="background-color:#F6F6F6" 
! style="background-color:#ffffff" | 
| colspan="5" | Wear Valley Independent Group win
|-

|- style="background-color:#F6F6F6" 
! style="background-color:#ffffff" | 
| colspan="5" | Derwentside Independents win
|-

C − D

|- style="background-color:#F6F6F6" 
! style="background-color:#ffffff" | 
| colspan="5" | Derwentside Independents win
|-

E − N

|- style="background-color:#F6F6F6" 
! style="background-color:#ffffff" | 
| colspan="5" | Derwentside Independents win
|-

|- style="background-color:#F6F6F6" 
! style="background-color:#ffffff" | 
| colspan="5" | Derwentside Independents win
|-
|- style="background-color:#F6F6F6" 
! style="background-color:#ffffff" | 
| colspan="5" | Derwentside Independents win
|-

P − S

|- style="background-color:#F6F6F6" 
! style="background-color:#ffffff" | 
| colspan="5" | Spennymoor Independents People Before Politics win
|-

T − W

|- style="background-color:#F6F6F6" 
! style="background-color:#ffffff" | 
| colspan="5" | Derwentside Independents win
|-

By-elections

References

2013 English local elections
2013
2010s in County Durham